Freiberger is a German surname. Notable people with this surname include:

Angela Freiberger, Brazilian artist
Bill Freiberger,  a television writer and producer
Fred Freiberger, a television producer best known for his work on Star Trek
Karl Freiberger, an Austrian weightlifter
Karl-Heinz Freiberger, a German field hockey player
Kevin Freiberger, a German footballer
Marc Freiberger, an American basketball player
Markus Freiberger. an Austrian racing cyclist
Miroslav Šalom Freiberger, a Croatian rabbi and spiritual leader

German-language surnames